Gustavo Omar Figueroa Cáceres (born August 30, 1978 in Santa Ana, California) is a United States-born, Ecuadorian former footballer who last played for Aucas.

External links
 
 
 
 Interview at Interactive.net.ec 

1978 births
Living people
Sportspeople from Santa Ana, California
American people of Ecuadorian descent
American emigrants to Ecuador
People with acquired Ecuadorian citizenship
Ecuadorian footballers
Association football forwards
L.D.U. Quito footballers
S.D. Aucas footballers
C.D. El Nacional footballers
Sporting Cristal footballers
C.S. Emelec footballers
C.D. Cuenca footballers
C.S.D. Macará footballers
Deportivo Azogues footballers
Mushuc Runa S.C. footballers
Ecuador international footballers
Ecuadorian expatriate footballers
2004 Copa América players